The Jefferson Lecture in the Humanities is an honorary lecture series established in 1972 by the National Endowment for the Humanities (NEH).  According to the NEH, the Lecture is "the highest honor the federal government confers for distinguished intellectual achievement in the humanities."

History of the Jefferson Lecture
The Jefferson Lecturer is selected each year by the National Council on the Humanities, the 26-member citizen advisory board of the NEH.   The honoree delivers a lecture in Washington, D.C., generally in conjunction with the spring meeting of the Council, and receives an honorarium of $10,000.  The stated purpose of the honor is to recognize "an individual who has made significant scholarly contributions in the humanities and who has the ability to communicate the knowledge and wisdom of the humanities in a broadly appealing way."

The first Jefferson Lecturer, in 1972, was Lionel Trilling.  He spoke on "Mind in the Modern World." Among other things, Trilling suggested that humanism had become the basis for social improvement, rather than science and the scientific method as has been predicted by Thomas Jefferson, the Lectures' namesake.  Ten years later, Gerald Holton, the first scientist invited to deliver the lecture, drew attention for responding to Trilling, proposing that Jefferson's vision of science as a force for social improvement was still viable, opining that there had been a "relocation of the center of gravity" of scientific inquiry toward solving society's important problems,  and cautioning that science education had to be improved dramatically or only a small "technological elite" would be equipped to take part in self-government.

The selection of the 2000 Jefferson Lecturer led to a spate of controversy.  The initial selection was President Bill Clinton.  William R. Ferris, chairman of the NEH, said that his intent was to establish a new tradition for every President to deliver a Jefferson Lecture during his or her presidency, and that this was consistent with the NEH's broader effort to increase public awareness of the humanities.  However, some scholars and political opponents objected that the choice of Clinton represented an inappropriate and unprecedented politicization of the NEH. The heads of the American Council of Learned Societies and the National Humanities Alliance expressed concerns about introducing political considerations into the selection, while William J. Bennett, a conservative Republican and former chairman of the NEH under President Ronald Reagan, charged that the proposal was an example of how Clinton had "corrupted all of those around him."  In the wake of the controversy, President Clinton declined the honor; a White House spokesperson said the President "didn't want the work of the National Endowment for the Humanities to be called into question."

Ultimately the 2000 honor went to historian James M. McPherson, whose lecture turned out to be very popular. Subsequently, the NEH revised the criteria for the award to place more emphasis on speaking skills and public appeal.

The next Jefferson Lecture, by playwright Arthur Miller, again led to attacks from conservatives such as Jay Nordlinger, who called it "a disgrace," and George Will, who did not like the political content of Miller's lecture and argued that Miller was not legitimately a "scholar."

Recent Jefferson Lecturers have included journalist/author Tom Wolfe; Straussian conservative political philosopher Harvey Mansfield; and novelist John Updike, who, in a nod to the NEH's Picturing America arts initiative, devoted his 2008 lecture to the subject of American art.  In his 2009 lecture, bioethicist and self-described "humanist" Leon Kass expressed his view that science has become separated from its humanistic origins, and the humanities have lost their connection to metaphysical and theological concerns.

In 2013 the NEH went in a different direction, selecting film director Martin Scorsese.  He was the first filmmaker chosen for the honor, and he spoke on "the evolution of his films, the art of storytelling, and the inspiration he draws from the humanities".  In 2014 the Jefferson Lecturer was author Walter Isaacson, and the 2015 honoree was playwright and actress Anna Deavere Smith.  As part of the NEH's celebration of its fiftieth anniversary in 2016, it selected documentarian Ken Burns to deliver the lecture.  The 2017 lecturer is University of Chicago philosophy and law professor Martha Nussbaum, who delivered her lecture, entitled "Powerlessness and the Politics of Blame", on May 1, 2017.

Publications based on Jefferson Lectures
A number of the Jefferson Lectures have led to books, including Holton's The Advancement of Science, and Its Burdens, John Hope Franklin's Racial Equality in America,  Henry Louis Gates' The Trials of Phillis Wheatley and Jaroslav Pelikan's The Vindication of Tradition. Updike's 2008 lecture was included in his posthumous 2012 collection Always Looking.

Bernard Lewis' 1990 lecture on "Western Civilization: A View from the East" was revised and reprinted in The Atlantic Monthly under the title "The Roots of Muslim Rage". According to one source, Lewis' lecture (and the subsequent article) first introduced the term "Islamic fundamentalism" to North America.

List of Jefferson Lecturers
The following table lists the Jefferson Lecturers and the titles of their lectures.

References

External links
 
 

Lecture series
American awards
Humanities awards
Awards established in 1972
1972 establishments in Washington, D.C.
National Endowment for the Humanities